Danny Pierce may refer to:
 Danny Pierce (American football)
 Danny Pierce (artist)

See also
 Daniel M. Pierce, American lawyer and politician from Illinois